Zirnay-e Olya (also Romanized as Zīrnāy-e ‘Olyā; also known as Zīrnā-e ‘Olyā) is a village in Doshman Ziari Rural District, in the Central District of Kohgiluyeh County, Kohgiluyeh and Boyer-Ahmad Province, Iran. At the 2006 census, its population was 44, in 8 families.

References 

Populated places in Kohgiluyeh County